Mount Bellows is a mountain, 2,390 m, located 3 nautical miles (6 km) west of Layman Peak at the east side of Ramsey Glacier. Named by Advisory Committee on Antarctic Names (US-ACAN) for Frederick A. Bellows, U.S. Navy, Radioman at McMurdo Station, 1964.

Mountains of the Ross Dependency
Dufek Coast